John Lacy Cason (July 30, 1918 – July 7, 1961), also credited as Bob Cason and John L. Cason, was an American actor active in both films and television. During his 20-year career he appeared in over 200 films and television shows. He is best known for his work on the television program The Adventures of Kit Carson, where he appeared in several roles from 1951 to 1953.

Life and career
Cason was born on July 30, 1918, in Valley View, Texas. He made his film debut, as a fighter in the 1941 classic Abbott and Costello comedy, Buck Privates. Cason was often cast as the bad guy, or henchman during his career, as in 1952's Black Hills Ambush. Most of his roles were un-credited, but he occasionally he received named billing, such as Henchman Lucas in the 1944 Western Wild Horse Phantom, as Blazer in Rimfire (1949), and as Westy in the 1953 Western, Gun Fury. Other notable films in which Cason appears include: Her Husband's Affairs (1947), starring Lucille Ball, Franchot Tone, and Edward Everett Horton; 1949's Tough Assignment, a crime film starring Don Barry; as Corporal Paluso in the classic war melodrama From Here to Eternity, starring Burt Lancaster, Montgomery Clift, and Frank Sinatra; the 1957 comedy, Don't Go Near the Water, starring Glenn Ford and Gia Scala; and as one of Glenn Ford's henchmen in the classic Western 3:10 to Yuma, which also stars Van Heflin; Cason also appeared in several film serials, including the featured role of Hopper in 1953's The Lost Planet, the recurring role of Casey in Desperadoes of the West (1950) starring Tom Keene, and as Smoky in 1952's Son of Geronimo: Apache Avenger starring Clayton Moore. His final film performance was in the role of Suggs in yet another Glen Ford Western, 1960's Cimarron, which also stars Maria Schell.

With the advent of television, Cason began appearing in television series.  His first appearance on the small screen was in 1949, in the first season of the series The Lone Ranger, appearing as a henchman. Other television series he appeared on include: Hopalong Cassidy (1952), several different roles from 1951 to 1953 on The Adventures of Kit Carson, several appearances on The Roy Rogers Show from 1953 to 1957, in different roles on several episodes of Judge Roy Bean in 1956, as several different guest roles on The Life and Legend of Wyatt Earp from 1956 to 1959, on both Maverick and Rawhide in 1960, and on The Untouchables and Bat Masterson in 1961. His final performance was on the 1961 episode of Lawman, "By the Book", in which he played the character Brad Oliver, which aired after his death in December 1961.

Death
Cason was killed in a car accident on July 7, 1961. He was buried in Grangeville Cemetery, in Armona, California.

Selected filmography

Buck Privates (1941) - Fighter (uncredited)
Fugitive Valley (1941) - Whip Rider (uncredited)
Badlands of Dakota (1941) - Townsman (uncredited)
The Apache Kid (1941) - Deputy Tom (uncredited)
You'll Never Get Rich (1941) - Soldier (uncredited)
Death Valley Outlaws (1941) - Vigilante (uncredited)
Down Mexico Way (1941) - Henchman (uncredited)
Go West, Young Lady (1941) - Barfly (uncredited)
Riders of the Badlands (1941) - Prison Guard (uncredited)
The Lone Star Vigilantes (1942) - Henchman Soldier (uncredited)
Valley of the Sun (1942) - Officer at Court Martial (uncredited)
Raiders of the West (1942) - Gene - First Auction Wiseguy (uncredited)
Raiders of the Range (1942) - Posse Rider (uncredited)
Down Rio Grande Way (1942) - Red (uncredited)
Westward Ho (1942) - Henchman (uncredited)
Rio Rita (1942) - Ranger (uncredited)
Bad Men of the Hills (1942) - Henchman (uncredited)
Shadows on the Sage (1942) - Cowhand (uncredited)
The Valley of Vanishing Men (1942, Serial) - Miner (uncredited)
Lost Canyon (1942) - Henchman (uncredited)
Border Patrol (1943) - Miner (uncredited)
Taxi, Mister (1943) - Ballplayer in Donnybrook (uncredited)
Murder on the Waterfront (1943) - Sailor Greeting Bus (uncredited)
The Vigilantes Ride (1943) - Henchman (uncredited)
Frontier Outlaws (1944) - Rancher (uncredited)
Follow the Boys (1944) - Soldier Listening to Radio (uncredited)
Valley of Vengeance (1944) - Henchman (uncredited)
The Contender (1944) - The Koko Kid (uncredited)
Spook Town (1944) - Henchman Breed (uncredited)
Sonora Stagecoach (1944) - Gunman #3 (uncredited)
Fuzzy Settles Down (1944) - Red Rock Townsman (uncredited)
The Hairy Ape (1944) - Bar Patron-Brawler (uncredited)
Mr. Winkle Goes to War (1944) - Soldier at USO Dance (uncredited)
Raiders of Ghost City (1944, Serial) - Barfly (uncredited)
Marked Trails (1944) - Chuck - Henchman (uncredited)
Brand of the Devil (1944) - Deputy / Henchman Ed (uncredited)
Land of the Outlaws (1944) - Lefty - Henchman (uncredited)
Wild Horse Phantom (1944) - Lucas - Henchman
Zorro's Black Whip (1944, Serial) - Henchman (uncredited)
Ghost Guns (1944) - Bart - Henchman
Harmony Trail (1944) - Townsman (uncredited)
Oath of Vengeance (1944) - Bart - Wounded Henchman (uncredited)
His Brother's Ghost (1945) - Henchman Jarrett
Gun Smoke (1945) - Red - Henchman
Shadows of Death (1945) - Henchman Butch
Counter-Attack (1945) - Paratrooper (uncredited)
Both Barrels Blazing (1945) - Henhcman Shad (uncredited)
Gangster's Den (1945) - Burke (uncredited)
Flame of the West (1945) - Slim (uncredited)
Stagecoach Outlaws (1945) - Joe - Henchman
Rustlers' Hideout (1945) - Charley Green (uncredited)
Border Badmen (1945) - Henchman (uncredited)
Flaming Bullets (1945) - Henchman Jim (uncredited)
Fighting Bill Carson (1945) - Henchman Joe
Prairie Rustlers (1945) - Gus (uncredited)
The Fighting Guardsman (1946) - Baptiste (uncredited)
Lightning Raiders (1946) - Henchman Gordon (uncredited)
Ambush Trail (1946) - Ed Blaine - Henchman
Larceny in Her Heart (1946) - Club Bouncer (uncredited)
Ghost of Hidden Valley (1946) - Henchman Buck
Prairie Badmen (1946) - Steve
Overland Riders (1946) - Henchman
Outlaws of the Plains (1946) - Joe Dayton (uncredited)
South of the Chisholm Trail (1947) - Fight Spectator (uncredited)
Over the Santa Fe Trail (1947) - Henchman (uncredited)
The Lone Hand Texan (1947) - Henchman (uncredited)
Prairie Raiders (1947) - Cinco - Henchman (uncredited)
The Last Round-up (1947) - Henchman Carter (uncredited)
Her Husband's Affairs (1947) - Heckler (uncredited)
Six-Gun Law (1948) - Ben - Henchman (uncredited)
The Wreck of the Hesperus (1948) - Thug (uncredited)
Relentless (1948) - Deputy Posse Member (uncredited)
The Gallant Legion (1948) - Sprauge (uncredited)
Trail to Laredo (1948) - Blaze - Henchman (uncredited)
Sunset Carson Rides Again (1948) - Sam Webster
Dead Man's Gold (1948) - Henchman Matt Conway
Mark of the Lash (1948) - Hechnman Colt Jackson
Belle Starr's Daughter (1948) - Kiowa Posseman
The Big Sombrero (1949) - Henchman Stacy (uncredited)
Challenge of the Range (1949) - Henchman Henley (uncredited)
Rimfire (1949) - Blazer
Laramie (1949) - Henchman (uncredited)
The Blazing Trail (1949) - Patterson Henchman (uncredited)
Ringside (1949) - Tiger Johnson
Feudin' Rhythm (1949) - Pete (uncredited)
Tough Assignment (1949) - Joe
Red Desert (1949) - Bob Horn - Henchman
Range Land (1949) - Rocky Rand - Henchman
The Traveling Saleswoman (1950) - Fred
Hostile Country (1950) - Ed Brady
Comanche Territory (1950) - Newcomer at Shindig (uncredited)
Marshal of Heldorado (1950) - Jake Tulliver
Crooked River (1950) - Kent
Colorado Ranger (1950) - Loco Joe
West of the Brazos (1950) - The Cyclone Kid
Fast on the Draw (1950) - Tex
Desperadoes of the West (1950, Serial) - Casey [Chs. 1, 8, 11, 12]
Streets of Ghost Town (1950) - John Wicks (uncredited)
Redwood Forest Trail (1950) - Henchman Curley
Wyoming Mail (1950) - Red Monte (uncredited)
Rustlers on Horseback (1950) - Henchman Murray
Stage to Tucson (1950) - Henchman (uncredited)
Prairie Roundup (1951) - Barton (uncredited)
Fort Savage Raiders (1951) - Henchman Gus
Wanted: Dead or Alive (1951) - Henchman (uncredited)
Don Daredevil Rides Again (1951, Serial) - Hagen
The Texas Rangers (1951) - Guard on Train (uncredited)
The Thundering Trail (1951) - Conway - Henchman
Westward the Women (1951) - Margaret's Awaiting Groom (uncredited)
The Black Lash (1952) - Henchman Cord
The Hawk of Wild River (1952) - Duke - Henchman (uncredited)
High Noon (1952) - Barfly (uncredited)
Black Hills Ambush (1952) - Henchman Jake
The Kid from Broken Gun (1952) - Chuck (uncredited)
Hellgate (1952) - Guard (uncredited)
Wagon Team (1952) - Henchman Slim
Son of Geronimo (1952, Serial) - Smoky (ch's 10–12) (uncredited)
Voodoo Tiger (1952) - Jerry Masters (uncredited)
Jungle Drums of Africa (1953, Serial) - Regas
Savage Frontier (1953) - Buck Matson - Henchman
The Lost Planet (1953) - Hopper
From Here to Eternity (1953) - Cpl. Paluso (uncredited)
Gun Fury (1953) - Westy (uncredited)
Thunder Over the Plains (1953) - Kehoe - Westman Henchman (uncredited)
Red River Shore (1953) - Joe - Henchman
The Boy from Oklahoma (1954) - Henchman (uncredited)
Saskatchewan (1954) - Cook (uncredited)
The Law vs. Billy the Kid (1954) - Nate - Posse Member (uncredited)
Cattle Queen of Montana (1954) -  Henchman (uncredited)
Treasure of Ruby Hills (1955) - Payne Henchman (uncredited)
Wyoming Renegades (1955) - O.C. Hanks
King of the Carnival (1955, Serial) - Henchman (uncredited)
Tennessee's Partner (1955) - Townsman (uncredited)
Count Three and Pray (1955) - Charlie Vancouver (uncredited)
The Last Frontier (1955) - First Sentry (uncredited)
A Lawless Street (1955) - Dean Ranch Hand (uncredited)
Top Gun (1955) - Ben (uncredited)
Jubal (1956) - Ranch Owner (uncredited)
Blackjack Ketchum, Desperado (1956) - Spade - Henchman (uncredited)
Over-Exposed (1956) - Studio Thug (uncredited)
He Laughed Last (1956) - Big Dan's Hood (uncredited)
Naked Gun (1956) - (scenes deleted)
The Storm Rider (1957) - Jasper (uncredited)
The Phantom Stagecoach (1957) - Henry Fox (uncredited)
The Iron Sheriff (1957) - Irate Townsman at Trial (uncredited)
Snowfire (1957) - Buff Stoner
3:10 to Yuma (1957) - Wade Henchman (uncredited)
Don't Go Near the Water (1957) - Seabee Metkoff (uncredited)
The Hard Man (1957) - Henchman with Eye Patch (uncredited)
Cowboy (1958) - Trail Hand (uncredited)
Screaming Mimi (1958) - Herb (uncredited)
Gunman's Walk (1958) - Wrangler (uncredited)
The Restless Gun (1958) in Episode "The Manhunters"
Gunmen from Laredo (1959) - Bob Sutton (uncredited)
Cimarron (1960) - Suggs (uncredited)

References

External links

 

1918 births
1961 deaths
Male actors from Texas
20th-century American male actors
American male film actors
American male television actors
Road incident deaths in California